Indie Book Awards may refer to
 Indie Book Awards (Australia), presented by Australian Independent Booksellers
 Next Generation Indie Book Awards, international awards based in the US presented by the Independent Book Publishing Professionals Group